
Bronte is a town and comune in the Metropolitan City of Catania, in Sicily, southern Italy. Bronte's economy relies mostly on farming, particularly of pistachio nuts. The town was settled and historically inhabited by the Arbëreshë community.

History
Bronte's name derives from that of one of the Cyclopes in Greek mythology and it means "The Thunderer". Legend has it that the Cyclopes lived under Mount Etna.

In 1520 Charles V united the twenty-four hamlets of the surrounding area, which formed the town of Bronte. Mount Etna nearly destroyed the town three times, in 1651, in 1832, and finally in 1843.

In 1799, King Ferdinand III created Bronte as a Duchy, and rewarded admiral Horatio Nelson with the title of Duke for the help he had provided him in suppressing the revolution in Naples and so in recovering his throne. As well as being made a Duke, Nelson was given as a fief the Castello di Maniace, which at the time was the remains of a Benedictine monastery. The Castle passed into the Bridport family when the 1st Viscount Bridport married the then Duchess of Bronte, who was Admiral Nelson's niece. The Bridports continued to live in the castle until 1982 when the current Viscount sold the property to the Comune of Bronte. Today it is a local tourist attraction in Maniace, and has been restored (including the recreation of ceramic-tiled floors) by the Comune. It is built in the style of an English country house (with formal garden) set in the hills of eastern Sicily.

In 1860, during Giuseppe Garibaldi's Expedition of the thousand, there was a citizen's revolt. Sicilian peasants had hoped for - and did not get from Garibaldi - reforms from the restrictive conditions imposed by noble landowners.  This hope had been reinforced by Garibaldi's decree of 2 June 1860 that land would be re-distributed. The southerners revolted in several localities including at Bronte, where 16 were cruelly massacred. Buildings were also set on fire, including the thea­tre, the municipal archive, other builds andany houses. On August 5th, 1860, Garibaldi's sent general Girolamo ("Nino") Bixio with two battalions of bersaglieri to restore order in Bronte. Bixio reached Bronte  the next day and repressed the riots. On the 9th trials where hastily setup, which only  lasted for four hours and led to the summary executions of six people. The facts and details of the riots and its repression have been the subject of reinterpretation and debate.

Main sights
Originally an abbey dating to 1174, it has a Gothic-Norman portico and contains a Byzantine icon which, according to tradition, was painted by St Luke.
 Church of the Annunziata (1535)
 Collegio Capizzi (1774–1779)

Twin towns
 Drogheda, Ireland

References

Sources
Pratt, Michael (2006); Nelson's Duchy: A Sicilian Anomaly, Spellmount Publishers Ltd. 
Fleming, Ian. Thunderball. (1961) Penguin Group. . P-076

External links 
 Photographic gallery 
English version of bronteinsieme.it nonprofit organization guide

Arbëresh settlements